Nimesha Gunasinghe (born 12 June 1995) is a Sri Lankan cricketer. He made his first-class debut for Nondescripts Cricket Club in the 2015–16 Premier League Tournament on 4 December 2015.

References

External links
 

1995 births
Living people
Sri Lankan cricketers
Nondescripts Cricket Club cricketers
Sportspeople from Kandy